Ernest Dudley Hare (5 December 1900, Highgate, London - 1981, London) was an English stage and film actor.

Filmography

References 

Who's Who in the Theatre: Hare, Ernest Dudley

English male stage actors
1981 deaths
1900 births
English male film actors
20th-century English male actors